= River Ogori =

River in Nigeria

River Ogori Ogori

Location
- Country: Nigeria
- State: Benue State

Physical characteristics
- Source
  - coordinates: 7°24′57″N 8°22′12″E
  - elevation: 106 metres (348 feet)
- Discharge
  - average: 3,477 m^{3}/s (122,800 cu ft/s)

River Ogori is a river in Nigeria. It is located in Ogoni, Ohimini, Benue State, in the central part of the state, near the settlements of Ikpajough and Ukanan, and is about 210 kilometers southeast of Abuja, the capital. The Ogori River is part of the Niger River drainage basin.
